Jordi Simon may refer to:

 Jordi Simón (cyclist) (born 1990), Spanish cyclist
 Jordi Simón (weightlifter) (born 1978), Spanish weightlifter